Wales is a civil parish in the Metropolitan Borough of Rotherham, South Yorkshire, England.  The parish contains 19 listed buildings that are recorded in the National Heritage List for England.  Of these, one is listed at Grade II*, the middle of the three grades, and the others are at Grade II, the lowest grade.  The parish contains the villages of Wales and Kiveton Park, and the surrounding area.  The listed buildings include houses and associated structures, a church, farmhouses and farm buildings, former mill buildings, two railway bridges, offices, a milepost, and a war memorial.


Key

Buildings

References

Citations

Sources

 

Lists of listed buildings in South Yorkshire
Buildings and structures in the Metropolitan Borough of Rotherham